The 1985 Jordanian  League (known as The Jordanian  League, was the 35th season of Jordan League since its inception in 1944. Al-Faysali won its  19th title.
The 1985 Jordan League season saw 12 teams in competition.

Teams

Map

League standings

References
RSSSF

Jordanian Pro League seasons
Jordan
Jordan
football